Sir Robert Throckmorton, 1st Baronet (1599–1650) was created a baronet, of Coughton, co. Warwick, on 1 September 1642.

Origins

He was the eldest son of John Throckmorton Esq. (1580-1614/15) by Agnes Wilford. John's grandfather was Sir Robert Throckmorton, KG (1513-1581), of Coughton Court, Warwickshire, and of Weston Underwood, Buckinghamshire, who unlike his brothers during the Reformation, one of whom, Job Throckmorton, became a puritan, adhered to the Roman Catholic faith, which religion was persisted in by his descendants until the 20th century.

Marriage

He married twice:
Firstly to Dorothy Fortescue, daughter of Francis Fortescue of Salden, Buckinghamshire, and granddaughter of John Fortescue of Salden, Chancellor of the Exchequer.
Secondly to Mary Smyth, daughter of Sir Francis Smyth (died 1629) of Ashby Folville and Queensborough in Leicestershire and of Wootton Wawen in Warwickshire, by Anne Markham. Mary was sister to Charles Smyth, 1st Viscount Carrington (1598–1665).

Progeny
By his second wife Mary Smyth he had the following issue:
Anne Throckmorton
Sir Francis Throckmorton, 2nd Baronet (1641-1680)

Death
He died on 16 January 1650 and was buried at Coughton Court.

Sources
thePeerage.com, Throckmorton

References

 
 

1599 births
1650 deaths
Baronets in the Baronetage of England
Robert
17th-century English people